Castleton is a village on the River Esk, part of the civil parish of Danby in the county of North Yorkshire in England. There was once a medieval castle sited on Castle Hill that is thought to have been abandoned when Danby Castle was constructed.

Castleton has a local school, church and a public house, The Downe Arms, as well as a small Co-op supermarket, a tea room and a public toilets. Castleton is a centre for walking, birdwatching, shooting and many other pursuits. It is said that Castleton was named after a castle built near the River Esk. The village has a Clapper bridge that spans Danby Beck; this bridge was listed as Grade II in 2016.

Castleton has a primary school (Castleton Community Primary School) with secondary education available at Caedmon College or Eskdale School, which are both in Whitby.

In times past Castleton was actually the main market and industrial town serving Upper Eskdale. There were annual wool, cheese and cattle fairs, cheese market and a silk mill. There is a show held at Castleton every September on the second Saturday in the month.

Transport
Castleton is served by Castleton Moor railway station on the Esk Valley Line roughly halfway between Middlesbrough and Whitby. Bus services through Castleton barely exist in the winter. However, on Sundays and Bank Holidays from spring to autumn, the village is served by the Moorsbus network.

The Esk Valley Walk runs through the village.

Anecdotes
The severed hand, known popularly as the Danby Hand of Glory, was found hidden in a wall of a thatched cottage in Castleton in 1935. The hand is now on display at the Whitby Museum in Pannett Park, Whitby.

Sport
Castleton Cricket Club was established in 1972 and its ground is based on the northern edge of the village along New Road. Castleton CC have two senior teams: a Saturday 1st XI that compete in the Langbaurgh Cricket League and a Midweek Senior XI in the Esk Valley Evening League.

References

External links 

Esk Valley website

Villages in North Yorkshire